Stokesley railway station was a railway station built to serve the town of Stokesley in North Yorkshire, England. It was closed in 1954 to passengers and eleven years later to goods.

History
A railway station had been planned for Stokesley in the 1830s when the Stockton & Darlington Railway Company issued a prospectus for an extension of their line from Yarm to Stokesley. In the end, this line was never built and the first railway station in Stokesley came about with the opening of the North Yorkshire and Cleveland Railway in 1857. The station was opened formally on 2 March 1857 and then to the public on the following day.

Stokesley is a market town, and as such, was the most important and heavily used station on the line, for both passengers and freight. Excursion trains would be laid on for the annual agricultural show and various freight workings used the yard. Between 1885 and 1922, tickets issued at Stokesley varied between 19,000 and 14,000, however, by 1934, this had fallen dramatically to 2,707.

Bradshaw's timetable of 1877 shows five out and back workings between Stockton railway station and Whitby, with connections advertised in Middlesbrough. Return services were just five a day with four coming from Whitby. The other service from Whitby reversed at Battersby and went to Stockton via  railway station. By 1946, eight years before closure, the service was down to just three stopping services each way per day, with most of the services from Whitby to Stockton reversing at Battersby and going via Middlesbrough.

Besides the main station buildings, which were on the eastbound platform, there was a signal box, the stationmaster's house, the house for the signalman and four workers cottages set in an "L" shape with a communal courtyard. The goods shed which was built in between 1857 and 1858 still stands. The goods sidings and coal depot were located on the northern side of the line. Fresh water was piped from a spring near to Battersby station with the pipe being laid between the two railway tracks.

The station features in the British Transport Films film entitled A Farmer Moves South. In it, a local farmer from Skutterskelfe moves his farm to Sussex on 31 December 1950, reputedly the coldest night of the year.

The station was closed to passengers in June 1954, with the tracks westbound being lifted so that all trains had to leave eastbound, making Stokesley a terminal station again. The station closed completely in August 1965.

References

Sources

External links
Farmer Moving South (whole film) hosted on Internet Archive

Disused railway stations in North Yorkshire
Former North Eastern Railway (UK) stations
Railway stations in Great Britain opened in 1857
Railway stations in Great Britain closed in 1965